"La Carcacha" is a song by American Tejano pop singer Selena. This song is also featured in the 1997 film. The music video for "La Carcacha" was shot in Monterrey, Nuevo León on March 20, 1992. It was the first music video ever for Selena y Los Dinos. "La Carcacha" was recognized as one of the award-winning songs at the first BMI Latin Awards in 1994.

Commercial performance
The song didn't originally enter the Latin charts but in the 2010s the song began entering the digital sales charts and eventually certified triple platinum in the United States.

Charts

Certifications

References

 

1992 songs
1992 singles
EMI Latin singles
Selena songs
Songs written by A. B. Quintanilla
Songs written by Ricky Vela
Song recordings produced by A. B. Quintanilla
Song recordings produced by Bebu Silvetti